Ercüment Güder (born 1923) was a Turkish footballer. He competed in the men's tournament at the 1952 Summer Olympics.

References

External links
 
 

1923 births
Possibly living people
Turkish footballers
Olympic footballers of Turkey
Footballers at the 1952 Summer Olympics
Place of birth missing
Association football defenders
MKE Ankaragücü footballers